Pittsburgh Railways operated 68 streetcar routes. The table below lists their dates of operation.


List

A notable, unnumbered, tripper (unscheduled extra) service was signed Stadium-Forbes Field, for Pitt Panthers and Pittsburgh Steelers football games and Pirates baseball games. Pitt Stadium and Forbes Field were convenient to the lines on Fifth Avenue and Forbes Avenue, both two-way streets during the trolley era. This service, which probably last ran in fall 1966, was no longer possible after the East End lines closed in January 1967.

Interurban lines 
The Interurban lines did not use route numbers. Outbound interurban cars were signed for their outbound destination, namely Charleroi, Roscoe or Washington; some PCC rollsigns instead prefixed Shannon- to the destination, e.g. Shannon-Washington. Inbound cars were signed simply Pittsburgh.

See also
 List of bus routes in Pittsburgh

References

Transportation in Pittsburgh
Pittsburgh
Pennsylvania transportation-related lists
Transportation in Allegheny County, Pennsylvania